Daniel Hargraves (born 6 December 1975) is a former Australian rules footballer who played for the Western Bulldogs and Fremantle in the Australian Football League.

He was originally drafted by the Bulldogs from the Eastern Under 18 side in the Under 18 Victorian Metropolitan Football League with selection 27 in the 1994 AFL pre-season draft. After playing 38 games over four seasons, he was traded to Fremantle in return for selection 18, which was used by the Bulldogs to draft Mark Alvey.  Hargraves would play only three games for Fremantle in two seasons before being delisted at the end of the 1999 season.

He then moved to South Australia to play for North Adelaide in the South Australian National Football League (SANFL) where he won the Ken Farmer Medal in 2002 as the SANFL's leading goal kicker with 68 goals. Hargraves moved to Port Adelaide Magpies in 2007 and was their leading goalscorer in 2008.  He retired from SANFL football at the end of the 2008 season, and signed to play for Nhill in the Wimmera Football League. In 2019 he signed with the Mannum Roos in the River Murray Football League.

References

External links

1975 births
Fremantle Football Club players
Western Bulldogs players
North Adelaide Football Club players
Port Adelaide Magpies players
Nhill Football Club players
Living people
Australian rules footballers from Victoria (Australia)
Peel Thunder Football Club players
South Fremantle Football Club players